Catherine Lord (born 1950) is an American autism researcher. She is Distinguished Professor-in-Residence at the School of Medicine at the University of California, Los Angeles; a member of the Scientific Research Council of the Child Mind Institute, and a Senior Research Scientist at the Semel Institute for Neuroscience and Human Behavior.

She co-developed the Autism Diagnostic Observation Schedule (ADOS) and the Autism Diagnostic Interview-Revised (ADI-R), which are together considered the "gold standard" in the diagnosis of autism spectrum disorder. In 2010, she was given the APA Award for Distinguished Professional Contributions to Applied Research.

Career
In 2018, she was elected a member of the American Academy of Arts and Sciences.

From 2012 to 2018, she was Professor of Psychology at Weill Cornell Medical College.

In 2017, Lord joined Tilray's Medical Advisory Board.

She is also Professor Emerita of Psychology and Psychiatry at the University of Michigan, where she was formerly the director of the University of Michigan Autism and Communication Disorders Center.

Dr. Lord directs The Lord Lab at UCLA, where she serves as the George Tarjan Distinguished Professor of Psychiatry in the David Geffen School of Medicine and as a Senior Research Scientist in the Semel Institute for Neuroscience and Human Behavior.

References

21st-century American psychologists
Autism researchers
Fellows of the American Academy of Arts and Sciences
1950 births
Living people
University of Michigan faculty
Members of the National Academy of Medicine
20th-century American psychologists